Western High School Early College is a public school in Louisville, Kentucky and is one of 22 high schools in Jefferson County Public Schools. The school offers programs that include: Early College, Culinary Arts, Geographic Information Systems (GIS), Help Desk, A+ certification, and Network+.

Academics

Freshman Academy
The Freshman Academy allows for an easy transition from middle school to high school. All core content classes are located in the Freshman Academy wing of the campus.

Early College
Western is one of only two schools in the state of Kentucky that offer Early College Programs. Through this program students can obtain up to 45 college credits by the time they graduate with no tuition fee. These credits apply to programs at Jefferson Community & Technical College (JCTC) or any Kentucky Community & Technical College System (KCTCS) college and transfer to all Kentucky public colleges and universities.

Talent Development Academies
Western is one of 11 JCPS high schools selected to transition to an academy model in the fall of 2017.  JCPS Talent Development Academies are small learning communities organized around career themes that show students links between their academic subjects and real-world career experience.  Western is home to a Business academy and a Service academy, which focus on preparing high school students for college and careers by aligning with specific industry clusters for Louisville and the surrounding region: business service, information technology, skilled trades (including culinary and carpentry), and healthcare.

Athletics
 Boys' and Girls' Cross Country
 Football
 Volleyball
 Boys and Girls Basketball
 Wrestling
 Baseball
 Softball
 Boys and Girls Track and Field
 Cheerleading
 Boys Golf

Notable alumni
 Parfait Bitee – Cameroonian basketball player with the University of Rhode Island
 George Bussey – American football offensive guard who is currently a free agent, played college football at Louisville
 Joe Jacoby – former American football offensive lineman for the Washington Redskins

References

Jefferson County Public Schools (Kentucky)
Public high schools in Kentucky
High schools in Louisville, Kentucky